(Hail, Queen of Heaven), WAB 8, is a motet composed by Anton Bruckner in  .

History 
The Marian antiphon was performed first on 25 March 1886 (Feast of the Annunciation).

Bruckner's manuscript is stored in the Österreichische Nationalbibliothek. The motet was first published in 1910 in the third yearbook of the Klosterneuburg Abbey. It has been re-edited by Wöss in 1921 together with the Zur Vermählungsfeier, WAB 54.

Music 
The motet is a harmonisation of the Gregorian antiphon Ave Regina caelorum for voice(s) and organ.

Discography 
According to Hans Roelofs, only two of the about ten recordings follow more or less Bruckner’s original score:
 Robert Shewan, Roberts Wesleyan College Chorale, Choral Works of Anton Bruckner – CD: Albany TROY 063, 1991
 Franz Farnberger, St. Florianer Sängerknaben, Anton Bruckner in St. Florian – Requiem & Motetten CD: Studio SM D2639 SM 44, 1997

References

Sources 

 Anton Bruckner – Sämtliche Werke, Band XXI: Kleine Kirchenmusikwerke, Musikwissenschaftlicher Verlag der Internationalen Bruckner-Gesellschaft, Hans Bauernfeind and Leopold Nowak (Editor), Vienna, 1984/2001
 Cornelis van Zwol, Anton Bruckner 1824–1896 – Leven en werken, uitg. Thoth, Bussum, Netherlands, 2012.

External links 
 
 Ave Regina WAB 8 Critical discography by Hans Roelofs 

Motets by Anton Bruckner
1886 compositions